FIBA Americas is a zone within FIBA (International Basketball Federation). It is one of FIBA's five continental confederations.  FIBA Americas is responsible for the organization and governance of the major international tournaments in the Americas. It has 44 FIBA Federations and is headquartered in Miami, Florida. The current FIBA Americas President is Carol Callan of the United States.

Members

FIBA World Rankings

Overview

FIBA Americas competitions

National teams
 FIBA AmeriCup (formerly known as the FIBA Americas Championship)
 FIBA Women's AmeriCup (formerly known as the FIBA Americas Championship for Women)

 FIBA Americas Under-18 Championship
 FIBA Americas Under-18 Championship for Women
 FIBA Americas Under-16 Championship
 FIBA Americas Under-16 Championship for Women
Defunct
 FIBA Americas Under-20 Championship
 FIBA Americas Under-20 Championship for Women

Clubs
 Basketball Champions League Americas (The FIBA Americas zone's top men's pro club competition, that is the first-tier level international competition for clubs in South America, Central America, the Caribbean, and Mexico.)
Defunct
 Campeonato Sudamericano de Clubes
 Campeonato Panamericano de Clubes de Básquetbol
 FIBA Americas League

FIBA Americas regional competitions 

 South America
 National teams
 FIBA South America Championship played by South American Countries
 FIBA South America Championship for Women
 FIBA South America Under-21 Championship
 FIBA South America Under-21 Championship for Women
 FIBA South America Under-17 Championship
 FIBA South America Under-17 Championship for Women
 FIBA South America Under-15 Championship
 FIBA South America Under-15 Championship for Women
 Clubs
 Liga Sudamericana de Básquetbol (LSB) (The second-tier level men's pro club international competition in South America.)
 Liga Sudamericana de Básquetbol for Women (LSBF)
 Centrobasket
 National teams
 FIBA Centrobasket played by Mexico, Central American, and Caribbean countries
 FIBA Centrobasket for Women
 FIBA Under-21 Centrobasket
 FIBA Under-17 Centrobasket
 FIBA Under-17 Centrobasket for Women
 FIBA Under-15 Centrobasket
 COCABA (Confederación Centroamericana de Baloncesto)
 National teams
 FIBA COCABA Championship played by Mexico and Central American countries
 FIBA COCABA Championship for Women
 FIBA COCABA Under 21 Championship for Men
 FIBA COCABA Under-21 Championship for Women
 FIBA COCABA Under-17 Championship for Men
 Clubs
 Campeonato de Clubes Campeones de Centroamerica
 CBC (Caribbean Basketball Confederation)
 National teams
 FIBA CBC Championship played by Caribbean countries
 FIBA CBC Championship for Women
 FIBA CBC Under-20 Championship for Men
 FIBA CBC Under-20 Championship for Women

Current champions

See also 
 Campeonato Sudamericano de Clubes
 Campeonato Panamericano de Clubes de Básquetbol
 FIBA Americas League

References

External links 
FIBA Americas Official Website 

Amer
Basketball in Puerto Rico
Organizations based in Puerto Rico
 
 
Pan-American sports governing bodies
Sports organizations established in 1975